The Estonian Orienteering Federation is the national Orienteering Federation of Estonia. It is recognized as the  orienteering federation for Estonia by the International Orienteering Federation, it became a member on 27 September 1991.

See also
 Estonian orienteers

References

External links
Official website

International Orienteering Federation members
Orienteering
1962 establishments in Estonia
Sports organizations established in 1962